Stenoporpia purpuraria is a species of moth in the family Geometridae first described by William Barnes and James Halliday McDunnough in 1913. It is found in North America.

The MONA or Hodges number for Stenoporpia purpuraria is 6464.

References

Further reading

 
 
 
 
 
 
 
 
 

Boarmiini
Moths described in 1913
Articles created by Qbugbot